Long Preston is a railway station on the Bentham Line, which runs between  and  via . It is owned by Network Rail and managed by Northern Trains.

Heading west, it is the last station before the Bentham Line and Settle and Carlisle Line diverge at Settle Junction, situated to the north of the village.

History
The station was opened on 30 July 1849 by the "Little" North Western Railway. It was later taken over by the Midland Railway.

Stationmasters

Samuel Shaw ca. 1851
W. Cooke until 1860
Thomas Cheetle 1860 - 1861
S. Hargreaves 1861 - 
Henry Lewis ca. 1871
J. Clementson until 1873 (afterwards station master at Shottle)
A. Nowell 1873 - 1874
H. Wright 1874 - 1881
Edwin Belfield 1881 - 1883 (formerly station master at Cotehill)
William George Mitchell 1883 - ca. 1914
H.H. Heelis before 1931
D. Lazonby until 1945  (afterwards station master at Clapham, Yorks.)

Facilities
Facilities at the station are somewhat basic. The original wooden station buildings were demolished in the early 1970s, and there are now just simple waiting shelters on each platform. There is an operational help point to obtain timetable information or emergency assistance. There is also a small car park.

The station is unstaffed, but a ticket machine was installed in 2019 to allow travellers to buy tickets before travelling. There is level access to the southbound platform only - the opposite side has a ramp, but this is quite steep and is not recommended for use by disabled travellers. Train running information is provided by telephone, digital information screens and timetable posters.

Services

Generally, there is a train at least every two hours from Long Preston southbound towards Leeds (thirteen departures per day in total) and northbound. All services from Leeds to Lancaster (eight per day) stop there, along with four Leeds to Carlisle trains.  There is also one train each day that runs north only as far as Ribblehead, whilst five Lancaster trains continue to Morecambe and the last southbound train terminates at Skipton.

For many years on Sundays, only Leeds - Morecambe trains stopped at Long Preston. However, since 2009, certain Carlisle trains have also served the station on Sundays. As a result, there are now five trains to Lancaster/Morecambe and two to Carlisle northbound and nine trains to Leeds southbound (the two morning/early afternoon services on the Morecambe line that formerly ran in summer only up until 2010 now run throughout the year).

References

Sources

 Bairstow, M. (2000), The 'Little' North Western Railway, Martin Bairstow, Leeds,

External links
 
 

Craven District
DfT Category F2 stations
Railway stations in North Yorkshire
Former Midland Railway stations
Railway stations in Great Britain opened in 1849
Northern franchise railway stations
1849 establishments in England